I Remember Clifford may refer to:

 I Remember Clifford (song), a 1956 song by Benny Golson
 I Remember Clifford (album), a 1992 album by Arturo Sandoval

See also
 Clifford Brown, jazz trumpeter